Ferdinando II de' Medici (14 July 1610 – 23 May 1670) was grand duke of Tuscany from 1621 to 1670. He was the eldest son of Cosimo II de' Medici and Maria Maddalena of Austria. He was remembered by his contemporaries as a man of culture and science, actively participating in the Accademia del Cimento, the first scientific society in Italy, formed by his younger brother, Leopoldo de' Medici. His 49-year rule was punctuated by the beginning of Tuscany's long economic decline, which was further exacerbated by his successor, Cosimo III de' Medici. He married Vittoria della Rovere, a first cousin, with whom he had two children who reached adulthood: the aforementioned Cosimo III, and Francesco Maria de' Medici, Duke of Rovere and Montefeltro, a cardinal.

Reign

Ferdinando was only 10 years of age when his father Cosimo II died. Because he had not yet reached maturity, his mother Maria Maddalena and paternal grandmother, Christina of Lorraine, acted as joint regents. His two regents arranged a marriage with Vittoria della Rovere, a granddaughter of the last Duke of Urbino, in 1633, in hopes of acquiring the Duchy. However, their political weakness prevented them from securing Urbino, and it was subsequently conquered by the Papal states. In his seventeenth year, Ferdinando embarked on a tour of Europe, traveling to Rome, Bologna, Ferrara, Venice, and finally Austria and Prague. One year later, his regency ended and his personal rule began. The dowager Grand Duchess Christina was the power behind the throne until her death in 1636. 

With his wife, Vittoria, he had two surviving children: Cosimo, in 1642, and Francesco Maria de' Medici, in 1660. The latter was the fruit of a brief reconciliation, as after the birth of Cosimo, the two became estranged; Vittoria caught Ferdinando in bed with a page, Count Bruto della Molera. In fact, Ferdinando sexual preferences went largely to men, and his lovers may have included the scientist and Ferdinando's personal physician, Francesco Redi.

The first calamity of Ferdinando’s reign was an outbreak of the plague that swept through Florence in 1630 and took 10% of the population with it. Unlike the Tuscan nobility, Ferdinando and his brothers stayed in the city to try to ameliorate the general suffering, traveling through the city on foot to help and encourage his subjects.

Tuscany participated in the Wars of Castro, the last time Medicean Tuscany was involved in a military conflict and inflicted a defeat on the forces of Pope Urban VIII in 1643. The treasury was so empty that when the Castro mercenaries were paid for the state could no longer afford to pay interest on government bonds. The interest rate was lowered by 0.75%. The economy became so decrepit that barter trade became prevalent in rural market places.

Ferdinando died on 23 May 1670 of apoplexy and dropsy. He was interred in the Basilica of San Lorenzo, the Medicis' crypt.

Ferdinando and science

Ferdinando was obsessed with new technology and had several hygrometers, barometers, thermometers and telescopes installed in the Palazzo Pitti. In 1654, influenced by Galileo, he is reported to have invented the sealed-glass thermometer by sealing the glass tip of a tube filled to a certain height with colored alcohol. Small glass bubbles filled with air at varying pressures hovered trapped within the liquid, changing positions as the temperature rose or fell. Marked off with 360 divisions, like the gradations or "degrees" of a circle, this type of device was called a "spirit thermometer", because it was filled with "spirit of wine" (distilled alcohol), or a "Florentine thermometer". In 1657, Leopoldo de' Medici, the grand duke’s youngest brother, established the Accademia del Cimento. It was set up to attract scientists from all over Tuscany to Florence for mutual study.

Ferdinand, like his father before him, was a patron, ally, and friend of Galileo Galilei. Galileo dedicated his Dialogue Concerning the Two Chief World Systems to him. This work led to Galileo's second set of hearings before the Inquisition. Ferdinand attempted to keep the concerns of the Holy See from leading to a full-fledged hearing and kept Galileo in Florence until December 1632, when the Roman Inquisitors finally threatened to bring Galileo to Rome in chains if he would not come voluntarily. In June 1633, the Roman Inquisition convicted the astronomer for "vehement suspicion of heresy" and sentenced him to imprisonment for life. After this was commuted to house arrest, Ferdinando came to visit the elderly scientist at his villa, where he lived out the remainder of his life.

Issue
From his unhappy marriage to Vittoria Della Rovere, Ferdinand II had four children, of which only two reached adulthood:
Cosimo, Grand-Prince of Tuscany (19 December 1639 – 21 December 1639)
A nameless daughter who died at birth (1640)
Cosimo III, (14 August 1642 – 31 October 1723), Grand Duke of Toscany following his father's death, married to Marguerite Louise d'Orléans, with issue
Francesco Maria (12 November 1660 – 3 February 1711), Duke of Rovere and Montefeltro, married to Eleonora Luisa Gonzaga, without issue

Ancestry

Citations

See also
Grand Duchy of Tuscany

References
Acton, Harold: The Last Medici, Macmillan, London, 1980, 
Strathern, Paul: The Medici: Godfathers of the Renaissance, Vintage books, London, 2003, 
Hale, J.R.: Florence and the Medici, Orion books, London, 1977,

External links

 (see index, v.1, for information about Ferdinando as a patron of the arts)
HISTORICAL FIGURE FERDINANDO II DE' MEDICI
Treccani (IT)
I MEDICI VISTI DA DIETRO: Ferdinando II (1610–1670) e Giovan Gastone (o Giangastone) de' Medici (1671–1737) (IT)

1610 births
1670 deaths
17th-century Italian nobility
17th-century LGBT people
Burials at San Lorenzo, Florence
Deaths from edema
Ferdinando 2
Ferdinando 2
Ferdinando 2
LGBT heads of state
Italian LGBT people
LGBT royalty
Nobility from Florence